Ronald Arthur Chamberlain (19 April 1901 – 12 May 1987) was a British lecturer, housing consultant and politician.

Educated at Owen's School, Islington and Gonville and Caius College, Cambridge, for many years he was secretary of the National Federation of Housing Societies He joined the Labour Party soon after the First World War.

At the 1945 general election he was the party's candidate for the south London suburban constituency of Norwood. The constituency had been held comfortably by the Conservatives since its creation in 1885, but a landslide in favour of Labour saw Chamberlain elected Member of Parliament, overturning a Conservative majority of 12,456 to win the seat by 2,023 votes. He was appointed parliamentary private secretary to the Minister of Town and Country Planning, Lewis Silkin.  Chamberlain was regarded as a "maverick" member on the left wing fringe of the Parliamentary Labour Party. He was disciplined after voting against the signing of the North Atlantic Treaty in 1949. He also controversially accepted an invitation to visit Francoist Spain, returning with favourable reports on the régime. He narrowly avoided de-selection prior to the 1950 general election. When the election was held he was unseated, with the Conservatives regaining the seat.

In April 1947 he was elected to Middlesex County Council to fill a casual vacancy in the representation of Hendon West. He held the county council seat until 1952 when he stepped down.

In 1971 he resigned from the Labour Party over its support for trade unions whose only purpose he claimed was the "continual forcing up of wage rates, regardless of their less fortunate brothers and sisters and equally regardless of the public interest."

References

External links 
 

1901 births
1987 deaths
UK MPs 1945–1950
Labour Party (UK) MPs for English constituencies
People educated at Dame Alice Owen's School
Alumni of Gonville and Caius College, Cambridge
Members of Middlesex County Council